Boulenger's emo skink or Admiralty five-striped skink (Emoia mivarti) is a species of lizard in the family Scincidae. It is found in the Admiralty Islands and Indonesia.

References

Emoia
Reptiles described in 1887
Reptiles of Papua New Guinea
Reptiles of Indonesia
Taxa named by George Albert Boulenger
Skinks of New Guinea